"Mechanical Emotion" is a 1984 song by Canadian singer Vanity. It was released as the second single in support of her debut solo album, Wild Animal. The single peaked at No. 23 on the Billboard R&B singles chart.

Track listing
US 7" single

UK 7" single

Personnel
Vanity – lead vocals, backing vocals
Morris Day – backing vocals
Bill Wolfer – composer (tracks: 2, 3)
Vanity – composer, producer 
Bill Wolfer – producer, arranger

Charts

References

1984 songs
Vanity (singer) songs
Songs written by Vanity (singer)
Motown singles